Michael Gray Dighton (born 24 April 1976) is an Australian cricket coach and former player. He played domestic cricket for Western Australia and Tasmania as well as English county cricket for Hampshire and Derbyshire. He was head coach of Canada from 2011 to 2012.

Playing career
Dighton was educated at Kent Street Senior High School in Perth . He began his career with the Western Warriors but later switched to the Tasmanian Tigers. He plays club cricket for North Hobart Cricket Club. He is an opening batsman, particularly in One-day cricket, and played a leading role in the Tigers victorious ING Cup campaign of 2004–05. He bowls occasional leg spin, and is also a wicket-keeper. Dighton has failed to recapture the form which saw him score at an average of 55 in 2003 in the Pura Cup, but still retains his place as one-day opener.

In 2007, he recorded the best bowling figures by a bowler on T20 debut (6-25) and was the only debutant to take a 6 wicket haul on T20 debut.

On 15 November 2008, Dighton scored 34 off 13 balls for the Emirates All*Stars against the Australian National Team in an exhibition Twenty/20 match. He and Adam Gilchrist scored quickly, hitting boundaries and helping the team (specially made for the occasion) on to win. During the fielding innings, he caught a surprising one handed catch in the deep to dismiss Cameron White.

Coaching career
Dighton was appointed head coach of the Canada national cricket team in September 2011. He resigned in April 2012 after the team failed to progress through the 2012 ICC World Twenty20 Qualifier.

References 

1976 births
Living people
Australian cricket coaches
Australian cricketers
Coaches of the Canada national cricket team
Cricketers from Toowoomba
Derbyshire cricketers
Hampshire cricketers
Netherlands cricketers
People educated at Kent Street Senior High School
Tasmania cricketers
Western Australia cricketers
Australian expatriates in Canada